The 1919 Buffalo Prospects season played in the New York Pro Football League and would go on to post a 9–1–1 record. The next year, the team would move into the American Professional Football Association (later renamed the National Football League).

The war and flu restrictions that had hampered the 1918 pro football season were no longer in place, and statewide play reopened after a one-year hiatus. Tommy Hughitt, who led the Buffalo Niagaras to a dominating championship among four semi-pro teams in Buffalo in 1918, initially left for Ohio in an attempt to revive the Youngstown Patricians; after one week, the Patricians folded, and by week 2, Hughitt was back in Buffalo, where he would spend the rest of his life. Hughitt signed with the Prospects, eventually leading them to the state championship.

Schedule

Game notes

References
 1919 Buffalo Prospects
 Pro Football Archives: Buffalo Prospects 1919

Buffalo All-Americans seasons
Buffalo Prospects
1919 in sports in New York (state)